Michel Ghaoui was a Lebanese boxer. He competed in the men's featherweight event at the 1948 Summer Olympics. At the 1948 Summer Olympics, he lost to Manuel Vidella of Chile.

References

External links
 

Year of birth missing
Possibly living people
Lebanese male boxers
Olympic boxers of Lebanon
Boxers at the 1948 Summer Olympics
Place of birth missing
Featherweight boxers